Roberto Russo may refer to:
 Roberto Russo (musician)
 Roberto Russo (volleyball)
 Roberto Russo (director), director of the 1983 film Flirt